The 2009 Fed Cup was the 46th edition of the most important competition between national teams in women's tennis.

The final took place at the Circolo del Tennis in Reggio Calabria, Italy, on 7–8 November. The home team, Italy, defeated the United States, 4–0, giving Italy their second title.

World Group

Draw

World Group play-offs

The four losing teams in the World Group first round ties (China, France, Argentina and Spain), and four winners of the World Group II ties (Slovakia, Germany, Serbia and Ukraine) entered the draw for the World Group play-offs. Four seeded teams, based on the latest Fed Cup ranking, were drawn against four unseeded teams.

Date: 25–26 April

World Group II

The World Group II was the second highest level of Fed Cup competition in 2009. Winners advanced to the World Group play-offs, and losers played in the World Group II play-offs.

Date: 7–8 February

World Group II play-offs

The four losing teams from World Group II (Belgium, Switzerland, Japan, and Israel) played off against qualifiers from Zonal Group I. Two teams qualified from Europe/Africa Zone (Estonia and Poland), one team from the Asia/Oceania Zone (Australia), and one team from the Americas Zone (Canada).

Date: 25–26 April

Americas Zone

 Nations in bold advanced to the higher level of competition.
 Nations in italics were relegated down to a lower level of competition.

Group I
Venue: Uniprix Stadium, Montreal, Canada (indoor hard)

Dates: 4–7 February

Participating Teams

Group II
Venue: Parque del Este, Santo Domingo, Dominican Republic (outdoor hard)

Dates: 21–25 April

Participating Teams

Asia/Oceania Zone

 Nations in bold advanced to the higher level of competition.
 Nations in italics were relegated down to a lower level of competition.

Group I
Venue: State Tennis Centre, Perth, Australia (outdoor hard)

Dates: 4–7 February

Participating Teams

Group II
Venue: State Tennis Centre, Perth, Australia (outdoor hard)

Dates: 4–6 February

Participating Teams

Europe/Africa Zone

 Nations in bold advanced to the higher level of competition.
 Nations in italics were relegated down to a lower level of competition.

Group I
Venue: Coral Tennis Club, Tallinn, Estonia (indoor hard)

Dates: 4–7 February

Participating Teams

Group II
Venue: Attaleya Shine Tennis Club, Antalya, Turkey (outdoor hard)

Dates: 21–25 April

Participating Teams

Group III
Venue: Marsa Sports Club, Marsa, Malta (outdoor hard)

Dates: 21–25 April

Participating Teams

Rankings
The rankings were measured after the three points during the year that play took place, and were collated by combining points earned from the previous four years.

References

External links 
 Fed Cup

 
Billie Jean King Cups by year
Fed Cup
2009 in women's tennis